Pamela Wallin  (born April 10, 1953) is a Canadian senator, former television journalist, and diplomat. She was appointed to the senate on January 2, 2009, where she initially sat as a Conservative.

Early life and career
Wallin was born in Wadena, Saskatchewan, and is of Swedish descent. Wallin spent much of her formative years in Wadena but completed her high school in Moose Jaw. In 1973, she graduated with a degree in psychology and political science from the University of Saskatchewan, Regina Campus (now the University of Regina) and began her career as an officer at the Saskatchewan Federal Penitentiary. Politically, she was a member of The Waffle, a left-wing faction in the New Democratic Party that existed in the early to mid-1970s.

Journalism
In 1974, she began her career in journalism, joining CBC Radio's news division. In 1978, she joined the Ottawa bureau of the Toronto Star where she remained for two years. In 1980 she joined CTV and became cohost, with Norm Perry, of Canada AM. In 1985, CTV named her its Ottawa bureau chief. She later rejoined Canada AM, hosting alongside J. D. Roberts.

In 1992, CBC Television hired Wallin in a highly publicized move. For many years, The National had been followed by a 40-minute nightly newsmagazine hosted by Barbara Frum, called The Journal. However, as a result of Frum's death in March 1992, the CBC wanted to revamp and reposition its entire approach to news programming.

In the fall of that year, Wallin and Peter Mansbridge debuted as the co-hosts of Prime Time News. Instead of Mansbridge reading the news on The National, followed by Frum introducing documentary and current affairs features and interviewing newsmakers on The Journal, the new show integrated the two former programs and featured Wallin and Mansbridge as equal co-hosts of the entire package. As well, the new show aired at 9 p.m., one hour earlier than the old National/Journal tandem.

The show fared poorly in the ratings and by 1994 had returned to its old format and time slot, with Mansbridge reading the news, followed by Wallin hosting a magazine segment which eventually took on the name The National Magazine. In April 1995, Wallin was dropped as host of The Magazine, and was succeeded in June by Hana Gartner.

Following her dismissal from CBC News, Wallin briefly returned to CTV as part of its coverage of the 1995 provincial election in Ontario, but did not rejoin the company permanently. Instead, she created her own production company, Pamela Wallin Productions, and launched a daily interview series called Pamela Wallin Live in 1995. Airing on CBC Newsworld and, in some years, on the CBC's main network as well, Pamela Wallin Live was a highly successful series which featured Wallin interviewing newsmakers, celebrities and other interesting personalities in a manner similar to CNN's Larry King Live. The show ran for four years before Wallin moved to the cable network TalkTV.

In 2000, Wallin hosted the Canadian edition of Who Wants to Be a Millionaire?.

Wallin has also published two books, Since You Asked and Speaking of Success, and has made cameo appearances on the Canadian comedy series Royal Canadian Air Farce and Corner Gas.

Diplomatic and academic appointments
In 2001, Wallin, along with Foreign Affairs Minister John Manley, was one of the organizers of the "Canada Loves New York" rally for Canadians to show their support after the September 11 attacks (Manley ran in the New York City Marathon in 2001, a contributing factor in the organization of the rally).

On June 25, 2002, Wallin's television career came to an end when Canadian Prime Minister Jean Chrétien advised Governor General Adrienne Clarkson to appoint Wallin to a four-year term as Canada's consul general in New York City, her first diplomatic posting. In 2003, Wallin and Senator Jerry Grafstein were honoured by the Canadian Society of New York for their ongoing commitment to strengthening the ties between Canada and the United States. In 2006, she became a senior advisor to the president of the Americas Society and the Council of the Americas in New York.

One of the perquisites of the post of Consul General was an official residence on Park Avenue.
In 2005, shortly before her term ended, Wallin bought a  apartment for US$379,000.

In March 2007, she was appointed the seventh chancellor of the University of Guelph and was installed in June. She sat on the Panel on Canada's Future Role in Afghanistan, chaired by Manley, a former cabinet minister.

She was also appointed by the governor general as an honorary colonel of the Royal Canadian Air Force.

Corporate boards
In 2006, Wallin was appointed to the board of Bell Globemedia, owners of The Globe and Mail and CTV Inc. From 2007 to 2011 she served on the board of Oilsands Quest, Inc. and has also served on the board of Gluskin Sheff & Associates, Inc., an investment and wealth management firm and as a member of the advisory board of BMO Harris Bank. In 2013, as a result of the Senate expense claims scandal she was embroiled in, Wallin resigned from all three paid positions she held outside of the Senate: as a director of Gluskin Sheff & Associates, a wealth management firm, in May 2013, the board of Porter Airlines in June 2013 after having been on the board since 2008, and the board of the Ideas Council.

Canadian Senate
On January 2, 2009, Wallin was appointed to the Senate of Canada on the advice of Prime Minister Stephen Harper. Following her expulsion from the Conservative Senate Caucus in 2013, Wallin identified as an Independent from 2013 to 2016. From 2016 until 2019, Wallin has caucused with the Independent Senators Group. On November 4, 2019, Senator Wallin joined the Canadian Senators Group.

Residency and travel expense controversy

Wallin decided to leave the Conservative caucus on May 17, 2013, until an audit into her expense claims could be completed. On November 5, 2013, the Senate voted to suspend Wallin without pay for the duration of the 41st Canadian Parliament for alleged theft from the public purse. The suspension ended with dissolution of parliament for the 2015 federal election. In 2016 the Royal Canadian Mounted Police announced that criminal charges would not be laid against Wallin over her expenses. She subsequently returned to the Senate in 2015.

Personal life
Wallin is divorced. She was diagnosed with colorectal cancer in 2001.

Honours

In 1994, her home town of Wadena, Saskatchewan named its major street Pamela Wallin Drive in her honour. In 1999, she was inducted into the Saskatchewan Order of Merit, and in 2007 was made an Officer of the Order of Canada. In 2008, Toastmasters International announced that Wallin would be that year's winner of their Golden Gavel award.

Wallin has received 13 honorary degrees, including from Athabasca University, the University of Lethbridge and the University of Windsor.

References

External links 

1953 births
Living people
Canadian diplomats
Canadian game show hosts
Canadian television news anchors
Canadian television talk show hosts
Canadian people of Swedish descent
Chancellors of the University of Guelph
Members of the Saskatchewan Order of Merit
Officers of the Order of Canada
Independent Canadian senators
Canadian senators from Saskatchewan
Women members of the Senate of Canada
People from Wadena, Saskatchewan
Women in Saskatchewan politics
Canadian autobiographers
Canadian women non-fiction writers
Canadian women television journalists
Women autobiographers
Canadian political journalists
21st-century Canadian politicians
21st-century Canadian women politicians
Canadian Senators Group
CBC Television people
CTV Television Network people
20th-century Canadian journalists
Canadian women diplomats
20th-century Canadian women
Canadian Screen Award winning journalists